Victor E. Brooks (born 24 May 1941) is a Jamaican athlete. He competed in the men's long jump at the 1968 Summer Olympics.

References

1941 births
Living people
Athletes (track and field) at the 1968 Summer Olympics
Jamaican male long jumpers
Olympic athletes of Jamaica
Athletes (track and field) at the 1962 British Empire and Commonwealth Games
Athletes (track and field) at the 1966 British Empire and Commonwealth Games
Commonwealth Games competitors for Jamaica
Place of birth missing (living people)